The Correaje Tempex was a webbing equipment used by the Argentine military at the end of the Junta era and in the Falklands War replacing the "outdated" but durable green leather webbing used at the time.

See also
Buzo Tactico Assault Vest

References

Personal military carrying equipment
Military equipment introduced in the 1980s
Military equipment of Argentina